Dorcadion infernale is a species of beetle in the family Cerambycidae. It was described by Mulsant and Rey in 1863. It is known from Turkey.

Subspecies
 Dorcadion infernale adremitense Breuning, 1966
 Dorcadion infernale asperatum Breuning, 1947
 Dorcadion infernale infernale Mulsant & Rey, 1863

References

infernale
Beetles described in 1863